Bremond is a city in Robertson County, Texas, United States. The population was 858 at the 2020 census.

History
Bremond is named for Paul Bremond (1810–1885), entrepreneur and founder of the Houston, East and West Texas Railroad 1875, who owned the surrounding land. Years later, the new owner, cotton baron William Marsh Rice, whose first wife was Bremond's daughter, Margaret, had the town surveyed and named after Bremond. The town was incorporated in 1870. In the 1870s a large number of Polish immigrants came to the area to grow cotton. Bremond holds an annual festival yearly to celebrate its Polish heritage.

In 1878, local resident Francis Marion Wootan discovered that the local water had a high mineral content. Following a popular trend at the time, Wootan began bottling the water and marketing it for its curing properties. Wootan Wells soon became a popular resort community, with four hotels and hundreds of support staff. (See also Mineral Wells, Texas)

In 1916, fire devastated the community, dealing a heavy blow to Wootan Wells also. Flooding and drought also contributed to the decline of the town, and in 1921 another fire shut down Wootan Wells permanently.

Texas Highway 6 was once routed through Bremond coming into town with Texas Highway 14 and took a sharp turn to the left in the town onto what is now Farm to Market Road 46. Highway 6 was later realigned and bypassed Bremond to the west.  Where Texas Highway 6 intersects Farm to Market Road 46 if you look to the right coming south and to the left going north you can still see part of the curve that the original highway made to go into Bremond from the north.

Geography

Bremond is located at  (31.166205, –96.676070).

Demographics

Bremond is part of the Bryan-College Station metropolitan area.

As of the 2020 United States census, there were 858 people, 452 households, and 217 families residing in the city.

As of the census of 2000, there were 876 people, 359 households, and 230 families residing in the city.  The population density was 966.7 people per square mile (371.7/km).  There were 466 housing units at an average density of 514.2 per square mile (197.7/km).  The racial makeup of the city was 82.65% White, 14.61% African American, 0.23% Native American, 0.23% Asian, 1.48% from other races, and 0.80% from two or more races. Hispanic or Latino of any race were 4.11% of the population.

There were 359 households, out of which 32.3% had children under the age of 18 living with them, 41.2% were married couples living together, 18.1% had a female householder with no husband present, and 35.7% were non-families. 33.1% of all households were made up of individuals, and 19.8% had someone living alone who was 65 years of age or older.  The average household size was 2.28 and the average family size was 2.88.

In the city, the population was spread out, with 26.9% under the age of 18, 5.6% from 18 to 24, 23.4% from 25 to 44, 19.3% from 45 to 64, and 24.8% who were 65 years of age or older.  The median age was 40 years. For every 100 females, there were 86.4 males.  For every 100 females age 18 and over, there were 78.3 males.

The median income for a household in the city was $27,054, and the median income for a family was $34,028. Males had a median income of $38,750 versus $21,719 for females. The per capita income for the city was $15,325.  Below the poverty line were 19.5% of people, 18.0% of families, 23.1% of those under 18 and 27.2% of those over 64.

Education

The City of Bremond is served by the Bremond Independent School District. Its mascot is a Tiger.

As of the 2018–2019 school year, it had registered 487 students.

35.1% of students were considered at risk of dropping out of school. 3.5% of students were enrolled in bilingual and English language learning programs.

External links
Bremond ISD website

References

Cities in Texas
Cities in Robertson County, Texas
Bryan–College Station
Populated places established in 1870
1870 establishments in Texas